Stoke upon Trent Rural District was a rural district in Staffordshire.  It was created in 1894 and consisted of two civil parishes, Bagnall and Stoke Rural. Both parishes and the district were abolished in 1922, being absorbed into the county borough of Stoke-on-Trent and the Cheadle Rural District.

References

Areas of Stoke-on-Trent
Districts of England created by the Local Government Act 1894
Local government in Staffordshire
Rural districts of England